The Ulodidae are a family of beetles belonging to Tenebrionoidea. They are native to the Southern Hemisphere, with species found in Australia, New Zealand, New Caledonia and Chile. Larvae and adults are generally found on dead wood or fungus associated with rotting wood, and are mycophagous. There are approximately 40 species in 16 genera.

Taxonomy 

 Arthopus (New Zealand)
 Brouniphylax (New Zealand)
 Dipsaconia (Australia)
 Exohadrus (New Zealand)
 Ganyme (Australia)
 Meryx (Australia)
 Notocerastes (Australia)
 Phaennis (Australia)
 Pteroderes (Chile)
 Syrphetodes (New Zealand)
 Trachyderas (Chile)
 Trachyderastes (New Caleodonia)
 Ulobostrichus (Australia)
 Ulocyphaleus (Chile)
 Ulodes (Australia)
 Waitomophylax (New Zealand, Holocene)

References

Tenebrionoidea
Beetle families